Celinda is a female given name related to Linda. It may refer to:

Celinda Arregui (1864-1941), feminist politician, writer, teacher, suffrage activist 
Celinda Lake, an American pollster and political strategist for the Democratic Party
Celinda Ortega, Miss New Jersey USA 2021, Miss Dominican Republic USA 2023
Celinda Pink (born 1957), American country music singer
Celinda Whitney, one of the namesakes of the Three Sisters Islands (New York)
Celinda Toobad, a character in the 1818 novel Nightmare Abbey by Thomas Love Peacock

See also
Celinda (opera), by Errico Petrella (see Raffaele Mirate)

Feminine given names
English feminine given names